Robert Lekachman (May 12, 1920 – January 14, 1989) was an economist known for his extensive advocacy of state intervention.

Early life, education and army service
Lekachman was born on May 12, 1920 in New York city. He received his A.B. from Columbia College in 1942 and Ph.D. from Columbia University. He served in the United States Army from March 1942 to December 1945. He was assigned to the 77th Infantry Division at Fort Jackson, South Carolina and became a clerk in a regimental headquarters. In World War II, he served in the Pacific War.

Career
Lekachman was also noted for an interpretation of Keynes's General Theory that made central its rejection of Say's Law (in favor of Walras' law). Lekachman identified as a socialist.

In his obituary, the New York Times wrote: "Throughout his career Dr. Lekachman espoused a philosophy that sought to promote social justice simultaneously with economic growth. He advocated compassion on the part of government toward the underprivileged. His last published work, which appeared last week in The Nation magazine, was a cautionary article of advice to President-elect George Bush."

He died at his Manhattan home at age 68 of liver cancer, survived by his wife Eva, who donated his papers in 1995.

Selected publications
National Policy for Economic Welfare at Home and Abroad. 1955. Doubleday.
A History of Economic Ideas. 1959. Harper.
The varieties of economics. 1962. Cleveland: World Pub Co.
Keynes and the classics. 1964. Heath.
Keynes's General Theory: Reports of Three Decades. 1964. St. Martin's Press.
The Age of Keynes. 1966. New York: Vintage Books.
National income and the public welfare. 1972. New York: Random House. 
Public service employment: jobs for all. 1972.
Inflation: the permanent problem of boom and bust. 1973. New York: Vintage Books. 
Economists at Bay : why the experts will never solve your problems. 1977. McGraw-Hill.
The great Tax debate.
Capitalism for Beginners. 1981. Pantheon
Greed Is Not Enough: Reaganomics. 1982. Pantheon.
Visions and Nightmares : America after Reagan. 1987. Macmillan.

References

1920 births
1989 deaths
20th-century American economists
20th-century American Jews
Economists from New York (state)
Barnard College faculty
Deaths from cancer in New York (state)
Columbia Business School faculty
Columbia College (New York) alumni
Columbia University faculty
Deaths from liver cancer
Lehman College faculty
Scientists from New York City
American socialists
Jewish American social scientists
United States Army soldiers
United States Army personnel of World War II